Leslie George Carter, known as Fruitbat (born 12 December 1958) is an English musician who was a member of Carter USM.

Career
Carter played in a number of bands during the late 1970s, before meeting Jim Bob (James Neil Morrison) at The Orchestra Pit in Streatham, where their bands The Ballpoints and Dead Clergy used to rehearse. When The Ballpoints' bassist quit at the end of 1980, Les joined the band, who went on to change their name to Peter Pan's Playground. When Peter Pan's Playground split, Carter and Morrison continued to write together and formed the band Jamie Wednesday.

Jamie Wednesday broke up in 1987 after limited success. Jim Bob and Fruitbat stuck together and formed Carter USM, a band in which the two both played guitars and sang while a sequencer and drum machine played backing music. Carter USM had 14 Top 40 singles, one number one album and played over 800 gigs all over the world. A cycling enthusiast, he wore a cycling hat on stage in the early years which became a strong visual trademark for the band. He would often take his bike with him on Carter tours, much to the annoyance of Jim Bob, as detailed in the book, Goodnight Jim Bob.

One of Carter USM's most talked-about moments was when Fruitbat rugby tackled presenter Phillip Schofield on live TV, in front of millions of viewers at the Smash Hits music awards. Schofield made some remarks about the band's performance and Fruitbat has said he was "severely hammered" after drinking a crate of beer supplied by The Farm. The incident made the front pages of many national UK tabloids, and generated infamy for the band.

Carter USM split in 1997, but continued to play semi-regular gigs until bringing the band to a close in 2014. Carter still runs the Carter USM website and fan club and sells band merchandise.  He currently lives in Folkestone, and has two current bands: his own, Abdoujaparov, and Nottinghamshire folk/punk band Ferocious Dog, for which he plays guitar. He plays bass in Keith Top Of The Pops & His Minor UK Indie Celebrity All-Star Backing Band. He also performs as Leslie George Carter, singing and playing acoustic guitar. In 2018 he formed Smokin' Donuts with long-time friend Doozer McDooze (Paul Short) after a solo slot turned into a duo slot and they alternately accompanied each other's songs.

Carter presented a weekly music show on Brentwood radio station, Phoenix FM between 2001 and 2011, and again in 2021.

References

External links
Carter USM family
Abdoujaparov homepage

Carter the Unstoppable Sex Machine
1958 births
Living people
English male singers
English rock guitarists
English male guitarists
Musicians from London